SS Howard Gray was a Liberty ship built in the United States during World War II. She was named after Howard Gray, an official with the Public Works Administration that was also active in the Alabama 4-H Club.

Construction
Howard Gray was laid down on 6 April 1944, under a Maritime Commission (MARCOM) contract, MC hull 2302, by J.A. Jones Construction, Panama City, Florida; she was sponsored by Mrs. Celeste Taylor, and launched on 18 May 1944.

History
She was allocated to Black Diamond Steamship Company, on 7 June 1944. On 20 April 1946, she was laid up in the National Defense Reserve Fleet, in the Hudson River Group. On 16 December 1946, she was relocated to the National Defense Reserve Fleet, in Wilmington, North Carolina. On 28 May 1947, she was transferred to the Italian Government, which in turn sold her to Marino Querci, Genoa, Italy, for commercial use. She was renamed Italico. She was first resold in 1959, and went through a couple of owners before being scrapped in Shanghai in 1969.

References

Bibliography

 
 
 
 
 

 

Liberty ships
Ships built in Panama City, Florida
1944 ships
Hudson River Reserve Fleet
Wilmington Reserve Fleet
Liberty ships transferred to Italy